Lindrith is an unincorporated community in Rio Arriba County, New Mexico, United States. Lindrith is located in southern Rio Arriba County along New Mexico State Road 595. Lindrith has a post office with ZIP code 87029. The Lindrith Airpark, a public-use airport, is located in Lindrith. Lindrith has a charter elementary school, the Lindrith Area Heritage School.

Demographics

References

Unincorporated communities in Rio Arriba County, New Mexico
Unincorporated communities in New Mexico